The Ayodhya Mosque is being constructed in Dhannipur, Ayodhya district, Uttar Pradesh, at the Supreme Court of India designated site following the verdict related to the Ayodhya dispute case. The construction of the Mosque and associated complex is under the Indo-Islamic Cultural Foundation (IICF) trust. The Dhannipur Mosque is almost 22 km away from the Ram Mandir, Ayodhya even though the Indian Supreme Court judgement mandated the construction of the mosque at a prominent place in Ayodhya town.

The construction began on 26 January 2021. The mosque is officially named as Ahmadullah Shah Mosque, as an honour to the leader of Indian Independence war of 1857,  Maulavi Ahmadullah Shah.

Location 
Dhannipur is a hamlet located in Sohawal tehsil in Faizabad district, officially Ayodhya district. The designated plot for the mosque is located at a distance of about 25 kilometers from the Babri Masjid site.

Construction 

The project was formally launched by the Uttar Pradesh Sunni Central Waqf Board by hoisting the national flag and planting saplings on Republic Day of 2021. The Mosque complex includes a hospital, museum, library, a community kitchen which can feed a maximum of 2000 people per day, an Indo-Islamic Cultural Research Centre and Publication House in addition to the mosque.

Around 40 per cent of the donations received by the Trust are given by Hindus, while Muslims have  contributed 30 per cent. The other 30 per cent of the total donations are corporate donations. Foundation secretary Athar Hussain confirmed that the Trust has to date received Rs 40 lakhs of donations and 40 per cent of it has been contributed by the Hindu community.

Controversy 
The All India Muslim Personal Law Board has stated that the construction of the mosque is against the Waqf Act and is illegal under Shariyat law. AIMIM chief Asaduddin Owaisi also claimed that donating money for construction and praying at the mosque is haraam(forbidden) according to Islamic principles to which the Mosque Trust replied that "serving humanity is not haraam".

Ownership dispute 

Two sisters from Delhi filed a petition in Lucknow bench of Allahabad High Court claiming ownership of the land allotted for the mosque along with surrounding 28 acres of land which they said was given to their father at the time of partition.

References 

Mosques in Uttar Pradesh